or  is a lake located in the municipality of Sørfold in Nordland county, Norway.  The  lake lies on the northeastern side of the village of Mørsvikbotn.  The European route E6 highway runs along the western edge of the lake.

See also
 List of lakes in Norway
 Geography of Norway

References

Sørfold
Lakes of Nordland